Bruce Springsteen with The Sessions Band: Live in Dublin is a 2007 video and audio offering that captures in-concert performances from the Bruce Springsteen with The Seeger Sessions Band Tour recorded in November 2006 at The Point Theatre in Dublin, Ireland.  The release consists of a concert DVD, a Blu-ray Disc, and separate two-CD audio set. A "special edition" of the CD set includes the concert DVD as well. The album is dedicated to friend and Irish show-business giant, Jim Aiken.

The DVD does not capture any one show in full, but rather collects recordings from three different shows at The Point.  Selections include fan favorites from the tour, radical "folk big band" reinterpretations of the Springsteen canon, and rare songs appearing for the first time on any Springsteen release.  At the same time, a few set list regulars from the tour and shows are omitted.

Of note is the dropping of "Seeger" from the band's name for this release, a very belated effort to avoid the mistaken stereotyping the name brought towards the kind of music the outfit was playing.

The DVD debuted at number 1 on the Billboard Video Chart.  The CD debuted at number 23 on the Billboard 200, selling 31,000 units, then fell to number 47 in its second week. As of July 11, 2007, it had sold 65,170 copies in the US.

Track listing
 "Atlantic City"
 "Old Dan Tucker"
 "Eyes on the Prize"
 "Jesse James"
 "Further On (Up the Road)"
 "O Mary Don't You Weep"
 "Erie Canal"
 "If I Should Fall Behind"
 "My Oklahoma Home"
 "Highway Patrolman"
 "Mrs. McGrath"
 "How Can a Poor Man Stand Such Times and Live?"
 "Jacob's Ladder"
 "Long Time Comin'"
 "Open All Night"
 "Pay Me My Money Down"
 "Growin' Up"
 "When the Saints Go Marching In"
 "This Little Light of Mine"
 "American Land"

Bonus songs 
 "Blinded by the Light"
 "Love of the Common People" (duet with Curtis King Jr.)
 "We Shall Overcome"
(The DVD includes an uncredited backstage performance of "Cadillac Ranch".)

PBS Edition bonus songs 
A special edition given as a donation reward during PBS pledge drives includes performances of five extra songs:

 "Bobby Jean"
 "The Ghost of Tom Joad"
 "Johnny 99"
 "For You"
 "My City of Ruins"

These songs were released on streaming platforms in February 2020.

Personnel 

 Bruce Springsteen – vocals, guitar, harmonica
 Sam Bardfeld – violin, vocals
 Art Baron – sousaphone, trombone, mandolin, penny whistle, euphonium
 Frank Bruno – acoustic guitar, vocals, field drum
 Jeremy Chatzky – Bass guitar, double bass
 Larry Eagle – drums, percussion
 Clark Gayton – trombone, vocals, percussion
 Charles Giordano – accordion, piano, Hammond organ, vocals
 Curtis King Jr. – vocals, percussion
 Greg Liszt – banjo, vocals
 Lisa Lowell – vocals, percussion
 Ed Manion – tenor and baritone saxophones, vocals, percussion
 Cindy Mizelle – vocals, percussion
 Curt Ramm – trumpet, vocals, percussion
 Marty Rifkin – pedal steel guitar, Dobro, mandolin
 Patti Scialfa – acoustic guitar, vocals
 Marc Anthony Thompson – acoustic guitar, vocals
 Soozie Tyrell – violin, vocals

Charts

Weekly charts

Year-end charts

Certifications

References

External links
 

2007 live albums
Bruce Springsteen live albums
Bruce Springsteen video albums
2007 video albums
Live video albums
Columbia Records live albums
Columbia Records video albums